The Texas Water Safari is a boat race down waterways from San Marcos, Texas, to Seadrift, Texas.  The total distance traveled is 262 miles. Racers must take all equipment needed with them, receiving only medical supplies, food, water, and ice along the way. The primary requirement is a boat powered only by human muscle. The event was first held in 1963, and is run annually. The race begins on the second Saturday of June of each year, barring bad weather.

In 1962 Frank Brown and Bill "Big Willie" George navigated from San Marcos to Corpus Christi without a motor. In 1963 they created the Texas Water Safari which would become an annual race.

Course
The  course includes natural rivers like the San Marcos, with rapids and dams. Most boats destroyed on the course are lost in the upper river. The San Marcos River converges with the Guadalupe River and becomes wider and slower. The main dangers in the middle river are sweepers, downed trees, logjams and  dams. Near the end of the course there are lakes and swamps, and it ends with a crossing of the San Antonio Bay. Other challenges include alligators, sharks, water moccasin, fire ants, and mosquitos.

There are 11 checkpoints including the finish line. Their locations are published and they are staffed with officials.  Each checkpoint has a cutoff time the racers must meet or be disqualified. The final cutoff time at the finish is 100 hours. The team captain of each team must be present at the checkpoint to sign off the team's time as the team leaves. Checkpoints:  
Staples Dam
Luling 90
Palmetto State Park
Gonzales 183
Hochheim
Cuero 766 (Cheapside)
Cuero 236
Victoria City Park
Swinging Bridge (often referred to as Invista or Dupont)
Salt Water Barrier
Seadrift

Records
Athletes compete in classes. The Unlimited class has no restriction, except that the watercraft is powered only by human muscle, and restricted since 2006 to crews no greater than six. Attempts have been made to race craft of unconventional form, but the best results have been achieved by well-trained teams in crewboats.
Overall Fastest Time / Unlimited: 29:46, 1997, Bryan & Fred Mynar, John Dunn, Jerry Cochran, Steve Landick, and Soloman Carriere
Tandem Unlimited: Fastest Time 35:17, 1987, John Bugge & Mike Shively
Men's Solo Unlimited: Fastest Time 36:03, 2007, Carter Johnson
Master's: Fastest Time 36:06, 2004, John Maika, Vance Sherrod, Pete Binnion, Jim Pye, and Pat Petrisky
USCA C-2: Fastest Time 36:27, 1997, Allen Spelce and West Hansen
Men's USCA C-1: Fastest Time 37:07, 2007, Jerry Rayburn
Mixed: Fastest Time 37:45, 2007, Deborah Lane and Fred Mynar
Standard: Fastest Time 38:18, 1992, Lynn Wilson and Ron Lightfoot of Canada
Aluminum: Fastest Time 38:55, 1997, Donald and Daniel Baumbach
Women's Unlimited: Fastest Time 41:39, 2015, Virginia Condie & Kaitlin Jiral
Novice: Fastest Time 44:03, 2004, Allen Chellette & George Melder
Adult-Child: Fastest Finish: 46:11, 1997, Kyle & Joe Mynar
Women's Solo Unlimited: Fastest Time 49:26, 2004, Holly Nelson (now Holly Orr)
Women's USCA C1: Fastest Time 57:49, 2014, Holly Orr
Youngest USCA C-1 Finisher & Winner, Female: Courtney Weber, 20Y 11M 28D, 2011
Youngest USCA C-1 Finisher & Winner, Male: Max Feaster, 17Y 9M 1D, 2010
Youngest Finisher: Jessica Bugge, 9Y 5M 12D, 2003
Youngest Woman Solo Finisher: Rebekah Zeek, 18Y 4M 28D, 2009
All-Time Tandem 'Safari Spirit' Team: Chris and Matthew "Matt" Baker, 2002, 2003

References

External links
Texas Water Safari Home
TPWD Texas River Guide
Footage of the Texas Water Safari (1966), Texas Archive of the Moving Image

Texas culture
Canoeing and kayaking competitions in the United States
Guadalupe River (Texas)
Canoe marathon
1963 establishments in Texas
Recurring sporting events established in 1963